Bodie is a ghost town in the Bodie Hills east of the Sierra Nevada mountain range in Mono County, California, United States. Bodie became a boom town in  after the discovery of a profitable line of gold; by 1879 it had a population of 7,000–10,000.

The U.S. Department of the Interior recognizes the designated Bodie Historic District as a National Historic Landmark.

Also registered as a California Historical Landmark, the ghost town officially was established as Bodie State Historic Park in 1962. It receives about 200,000 visitors yearly. Bodie State Historic Park is partly supported by the Bodie Foundation.

History

Discovery of gold 
Bodie began as a mining camp of little note following the discovery of gold in 1859 by a group of prospectors, including W. S. Bodey. Bodey died in a blizzard the following November while making a supply trip to Monoville (near present-day Mono City), never getting to see the rise of the town that was named after him. According to area pioneer Judge J. G. McClinton, the district's name was changed from "Bodey," "Body," and a few other phonetic variations, to "Bodie," after a painter in the nearby boomtown of Aurora, lettered a sign "Bodie Stables".

Gold discovered at Bodie coincided with the discovery of silver at nearby Aurora (thought to be in California, later found to be Nevada), and the distant Comstock Lode beneath Virginia City, Nevada. But while these two towns boomed, interest in Bodie remained lackluster. By 1868 only two companies had built stamp mills at Bodie, and both had failed.

Boom 

In 1876, the Standard Company discovered a profitable deposit of gold-bearing ore, which transformed Bodie from an isolated mining camp comprising a few prospectors and company employees to a Wild West boomtown. Rich discoveries in the adjacent Bodie Mine during 1878 attracted even more hopeful people. By 1879, Bodie had a population of approximately 7,000–10,000 people and around 2,000 buildings. One legend says that in 1880, Bodie was California's second or third largest city, but the U.S. Census of that year disproves this. Over the years 1860–1941 Bodie's mines produced gold and silver valued at an estimated  (in 1986 dollars, or $85 million in 2021).

Bodie boomed from late 1877 through mid to late 1880. The first newspaper, The Standard Pioneer Journal of Mono County, published its first edition on October 10, 1877. Starting as a weekly, it soon expanded publication to three times a week. It was also during this time that a telegraph line was built which connected Bodie with Bridgeport and Genoa, Nevada. California and Nevada newspapers predicted Bodie would become the next Comstock Lode. Men from both states were lured to Bodie by the prospect of another bonanza.

Gold bullion from the town's nine stamp mills was shipped to Carson City, Nevada, by way of Aurora, Wellington and Gardnerville. Most shipments were accompanied by armed guards. After the bullion reached Carson City, it was delivered to the mint there, or sent by rail to the mint in San Francisco.

Districts and amenities

As a bustling gold mining center, Bodie had the amenities of larger towns, including a Wells Fargo Bank, four volunteer fire companies, a brass band, railroad, miners' and mechanics' union, several daily newspapers, and a jail. At its peak, 65 saloons lined Main Street, which was a mile long. Murders, shootouts, barroom brawls, and stagecoach holdups were regular occurrences.

As with other remote mining towns, Bodie had a popular, though clandestine, red light district on the north end of town. There is an unsubstantiated story of Rosa May, a prostitute who, in the style of Florence Nightingale, came to the aid of the town menfolk when a serious epidemic struck the town at the height of its boom. She is credited with giving life-saving care to many, but after she died, was buried outside the cemetery fence.

Bodie had a Chinatown, the main street of which ran at a right angle to Bodie's Main Street. At one point it had several hundred Chinese residents and a Taoist temple. Opium dens were plentiful in this area.

Bodie also had a cemetery on the outskirts of town and a nearby mortuary. It is the only building in the town built of red brick three courses thick, most likely for insulation to keep the air temperature steady during the cold winters and hot summers. The cemetery includes a Miners Union section, and a cenotaph erected to honor President James A. Garfield. The Bodie Boot Hill was located outside of the official city cemetery.

On Main Street stands the Miners Union Hall, which was the meeting place for labor unions. It also served as an entertainment center that hosted dances, concerts, plays, and school recitals. It now serves as a museum.

Mining town 

The first signs of decline appeared in 1880 and became obvious toward the end of the year. Promising mining booms in Butte, Montana; Tombstone, Arizona; and Utah lured men away from Bodie. The get-rich-quick, single miners who came to the town in the 1870s moved on to these other booms, and Bodie developed into a family-oriented community. In 1882 residents built the Methodist Church (which still stands) and the Roman Catholic Church (burned 1928). Despite the population decline, the mines were flourishing, and in 1881 Bodie's ore production was recorded at a high of $3.1 million. Also in 1881, a narrow-gauge railroad was built called the Bodie Railway & Lumber Company, bringing lumber, cordwood, and mine timbers to the mining district from Mono Mills south of Mono Lake.

During the early 1890s, Bodie enjoyed a short revival from technological advancements in the mines that continued to support the town. In 1890, the recently invented cyanide process promised to recover gold and silver from discarded mill tailings and from low-grade ore bodies that had been passed over. This pioneering installation marked the country's first transmissions of electricity over a long distance.

In 1910, the population was recorded at 698 people, which were predominantly families who decided to stay in Bodie instead of moving on to other prosperous strikes.

Decline 

The first signs of an official decline occurred in 1912 with the printing of the last Bodie newspaper, The Bodie Miner. In a 1913 book titled California Tourist Guide and Handbook: Authentic Description of Routes of Travel and Points of Interest in California, the authors, Wells and Aubrey Drury, described Bodie as a "mining town, which is the center of a large mineral region". They referred to two hotels and a railroad operating there. In 1913, the Standard Consolidated Mine closed.

Mining profits in 1914 were at a low of $6,821. James S. Cain bought everything from the town lots to the mining claims, and reopened the Standard mill to former employees, which resulted in an over $100,000 profit in 1915. However, this financial growth was not in time to stop the town's decline. In 1917, the Bodie Railway was abandoned and its iron tracks were scrapped.

The last mine closed in 1942, due to War Production Board order L-208, shutting down all non-essential gold mines in the United States during World War II. Mining never resumed after the war.

Bodie was first described as a "ghost town" in 1915. In a time when auto travel was on the rise, many travelers reached Bodie via automobiles. The San Francisco Chronicle published an article in 1919 to dispute the "ghost town" label.

By 1920, Bodie's population was recorded by the US Federal Census at a total of 120 people. Despite the decline and a severe fire in the business district in 1932, Bodie had permanent residents through nearly half of the 20th century. A post office operated at Bodie from 1877 to 1942.

Ghost town and park 
In the 1940s, the threat of vandalism faced the ghost town. The Cain family, who owned much of the land, hired caretakers to protect and to maintain the town's structures. Martin Gianettoni, one of the last three people living in Bodie in 1943, was a caretaker.

Bodie is now an authentic Wild West ghost town.

The town was designated a National Historic Landmark in 1961, and in 1962 the state legislature authorized creation of Bodie State Historic Park. A total of 170 buildings remained. Bodie has been named as California's official state gold rush ghost town.

Visitors arrive mainly via SR 270, which runs from US 395 near Bridgeport to the west; the last three miles of it is a dirt road. There is also a road to SR 167 near Mono Lake in the south, but this road is extremely rough, with more than 10 miles of dirt track in a bad state of repair. Due to heavy snowfall, the roads to Bodie are usually closed in winter .

Today, Bodie is preserved in a state of arrested decay. Only a small part of the town survived, with about 110 structures still standing, including one of many once operational gold mills. Visitors can walk the deserted streets of a town that once was a bustling area of activity. Interiors remain as they were left and stocked with goods.  Littered throughout the park, one can find small shards of china dishes, square nails and an occasional bottle, but removing these items is against the rules of the park.

The California State Parks' ranger station is located in one of the original homes on Green Street.

In 2009 and again in 2010, Bodie was scheduled to be closed. The California state legislature worked out a budget compromise that enabled the state's Parks Closure Commission to keep it open. As of 2022, the park is still operating, now administered by the Bodie Foundation.

Climate 

Bodie is a rare example of the dry-summer subarctic climate (Köppen climate classification Dsc), with hot to freezing summers and long, snowy winters, and is part of USDA Plant Hardiness Zone 5. Nights remain cold even through the summer, often dropping well below freezing throughout the year.

With an average of 303 nights below freezing per year, Bodie rivals Utqiagvik, Alaska's 315, and no month has ever been completely frost-free.

The longest frost-free period is a mere thirty days from July 20 to August 18, 1901, but to illustrate the vast diurnal temperature range, Bodie had as many as 98 consecutive maxima at or above  between June 9 and September 14, 2007 – which included the record hot July 2007 with mean maximum .

The harsh weather is due to a particular combination of high altitude and a very exposed plateau, with little in the way of a natural surrounding wall to protect the long, flat piece of land from the elements. Plenty of firewood was needed to keep residents warm through the long winters. Bodie is not located in a forest, so lumber had to be imported from Bridgeport, Benton, Carson City or Mono Mills. The winter of 1878–79 was particularly harsh and claimed the lives of many residents. On average, there are 22.7 days with + highs, 19.6 days where the high fails to rise above freezing, and 35 nights with sub- lows.

There are an average of 60 days annually with measurable precipitation.

In fiction 
 Bodie was the setting for the young reader's novel Behind the Masks, by Susan Patron.
 Kathleen Haun's historical novel No Trees for Shade (2013) is set in Bodie in 1880.
 Key incidents in Chapter One of James Rollins' tenth Sigma Force novel, The Sixth Extinction (2014), span nearby Mono Lake, the secret military testing site neighboring Bodie Park, and the ghost town itself, where terrorists attack a National Park Service Ranger and details unfold about both the area's significance to the rest of the plot.
 Bodie is the setting for the Kristiana Gregory book Orphan Runaways (1998).

See also 
 Bodie, Washington
 List of California state parks
 Rosa May
 Madame Moustache

References

Bibliography

External links 

 Official Bodie Foundation – A non-profit organization
 Official Bodie State Historic Park website
 Learn about and tour Bodie online at Bodie.com
 LANDFIRE National Application Report: California's Bodie Hills (conservation action plan)

California State Historic Parks
Ghost towns in California
History of Mono County, California
Mining museums in California
Museums in Mono County, California
History museums in California
Open-air museums in California
Parks in Mono County, California
Former settlements in Mono County, California
Mining communities in California
California Historical Landmarks
Historic districts on the National Register of Historic Places in California
National Historic Landmarks in California
National Register of Historic Places in Mono County, California
History of the Sierra Nevada (United States)
Populated places established in 1876
1876 establishments in California
Protected areas established in 1962
1962 establishments in California
Boot Hill cemeteries
Populated places on the National Register of Historic Places in California